Ottakoil is a village in the Ariyalur taluk of Ariyalur district, Tamil Nadu, India.

Demographics 

 census, Ottakoil had a total population of 3882 with 1913 males and 1969 females.

References 

Villages in Ariyalur district